A superwind is an extremely dense wind emanating from asymptotic giant branch stars towards the end of their lives.

References 

Stellar evolution
Stellar phenomena